Vil Ambu is a 2016 Indian Tamil-language action thriller film written and directed by Ramesh Subramaniam and presented by Suseenthiran. The film stars Sri, Harish Kalyan, Srushti Dange, Chandini Tamilarasan, and Samskruthy Shenoy, while Harish Uthaman and Yogi Babu play supporting roles. The music was composed by Navin with cinematography by E. Martin Joe and editing by Ruben. The film released on 12 February 2016.

Plot 
Vil Ambu is a journey of two characters and talks about how humans are responsible for each other's loss or gain. The story is about how the loss of one person becomes the gain of the other.

Cast 

 Sri as Karthik
 Harish Kalyan as Arul
 Srushti Dange as Nithya
 Chandini Tamilarasan as Kanakavalli
 Samskruthy Shenoy as Poonkodi
 Nandakumar as Sekar, Poonkodi's father
 Nisha Ganesh as Kavya, Arul's sister
 Harish Uthaman as Siva
 Yogi Babu as Honest
 Ramachandran Durairaj as Logu
 Hello Kandasamy as Karthik's father
 Saivam Kala as Karthik's mother
 Rindhu Ravi as Arul's mother
 Five Star Kalyan as Balaguru

Production 
Following the success of Jeeva (2014), Suseenthiran announced that his next film revolves around events taking place in South Chennai. Suseenthiran subsequently announced that Harish Kalyan and Sri would be starring, while Harish Uthaman and Nandakumar would play the villains. Samskruthy Shenoy, who had previously been seen in Malayalam films, was signed on to play one of the three leading female roles. The other two roles were given to Srushti Dange and Chandini Tamilarasan, who would play a college student and a slum dweller, respectively. Navin, who composed music for Kalyana Samayal Saadham (2013), was chosen to compose the film's music, while Star Productions and Nallu Studios co-produce the venture. Despite reports which claimed Suseenthiran himself would direct it, he chose to only present it and newcomer Ramesh was signed as director.

The film began shoot in Coimbatore in early October 2014 with a working title of Nerukku Ner, while it has also previously been dubbed as Agni Natchathiram. Notably, both titles are yesteryear films featuring dual lead characters, as like the roles of Sri and Harish Kalyan in the venture. In April 2015, the official title was revealed to be Vil Ambu, with actress Kajal Aggarwal launching the film's motion poster.

Soundtrack 
Music is composed by Navin.

Critical reception 
Rediff wrote, "Director Ramesh may have failed to capitalise on an intelligent plot but Vil Ambu is an engaging thriller, well worth a watch." Behindwoods wrote "Director Ramesh Subramaniam has narrated an emotional story that doesn't lose the direction at any point. Also, the only problem in the story is its transparency, it becomes a challenge for the storyteller to retain the connection developed with the audience in the first half."

References

External links 

2016 films
Indian action thriller films
Indian thriller drama films
2010s Tamil-language films
Films shot in Coimbatore